The Center School is a historic school building at 13 Bedford Street in Burlington, Massachusetts.  The one-room wood-frame schoolhouse was built in 1855, and occupies a prominent place in the center of Burlington.  The building is basically Greek Revival in style, with some Italianate features. It modified in 1898 when it was adapted for use as a library.  At that time, the typical paired entrances were replaced by a single entrance with a Colonial Revival treatment. The building served as a library until 1968, and was pressed into service in 1970 to temporarily house the police department.  Its tenancy was short-lived, with the premises abandoned after the building was damaged by a Molotov cocktail.  The building has since then served as the town's history museum.

The building was listed on the National Register of Historic Places in 2006.

See also
National Register of Historic Places listings in Middlesex County, Massachusetts

References

School buildings completed in 1855
School buildings on the National Register of Historic Places in Massachusetts
Burlington, Massachusetts
National Register of Historic Places in Middlesex County, Massachusetts